Trond Amundsen can refer to:

Trond Amundsen (biologist) (born 1957), Norwegian biologist
Trond Amundsen (football coach) (born 1971),  Norwegian football coach